Röhrmoos station is a railway station in the municipality of Röhrmoos, located in the Dachau district in Upper Bavaria, Germany.

References

External links

Munich S-Bahn stations
Railway stations in Bavaria
Railway stations in Germany opened in 1867
1867 establishments in Bavaria
Buildings and structures in Dachau (district)